Hectic or variation, may refer to:

 Hectic, the 1988 debut EP by ska band Operation Ivy
 "Hectic", a song by American rapper Cardi B from the mixtape Gangsta Bitch Music, Vol. 2
 "Hectic", a song by South Korean rapper RM from his 2022 album Indigo
 The Hectics (1958–1962), the first (school) band of Freddie Mercury
 Hectic Records, a music label
 Operation Hectic, an assassination plot during the Rhodesian Bush War
 Hectic Fever (or hectic), a symptom of the illness of consumption
 Kurt Hectic, the main character from the video game MDK

See also

 Hectic equation